20th Ohio Battery was an artillery battery that served in the Union Army during the American Civil War.

Service
The 20th Ohio Battery was organized at Camp Taylor in Cleveland, Ohio and mustered in October 29, 1862, for a three-year enlistment under Captain Louis Smithwright.

The battery was attached to 2nd Division, XX Corps, Army of the Cumberland, to October 1863. 1st Division, Artillery Reserve, Department of the Cumberland, to November 1863. Artillery, 3rd Division, IV Corps, Army of the Cumberland, to December 1863. Garrison Artillery, Chattanooga, Tennessee, Department of the Cumberland, to November 1864. Garrison Artillery, at Nashville, Tennessee, Department of the Cumberland, to February 1865. Garrison Artillery, at Chattanooga, Tennessee, until July 1865.

The 20th Ohio Battery mustered out of service on July 19, 1865.

Detailed service
 Moved to Murfreesboro, Tenn., December 31, 1862, arriving there February 8, 1863. 
Duty at Murfreesboro, Tenn., until June 1863. 
 Tullahoma Campaign June 23-July 7. 
 Liberty Gap June 24–27. Chickamauga Campaign August 16-September 22. 
 Battle of Chickamauga September 19–20. 
 Siege of Chattanooga, Tenn., September 24-November 23. 
 Attached to Garrison Artillery at Chattanooga until June 1864. 
 Chattanooga-Ringgold Campaign November 23–27, 1863. 
 Engaged in repelling attacks of rebel cavalry under Forrest and Wheeler on the flanks of Sherman's army during the Atlanta Campaign. Action at Dalton, Ga., August 14–16. 
 Marched to Alpine, Ga., September 4–20, then marched to Pulaski, Tenn. 
 Surrender of Dalton October 13 (one section). 
 Nashville Campaign November–December. 
 In front of Columbia, Duck River, November 24–27. 
 Spring Hill and Thompson's Station November 29. 
 Battle of Franklin November 30. 
 Battle of Nashville December 15–16. 
 Pursuit of Hood to the Tennessee River December 17–28. 
 Moved to Chattanooga, Tenn., and garrison duty there until July 2, 1865.

Casualties
The battery lost a total of 24 men during service; 1 officer and 5 enlisted men killed or mortally wounded, 1 officer and 17 enlisted men died due to disease.

Commanders
 Captain Louis Smithwright
 Captain John F. Edward Grosskopff
 Captain William Backus

See also

 List of Ohio Civil War units
 Ohio in the Civil War

References
 Dyer, Frederick H.  A Compendium of the War of the Rebellion (Des Moines, IA:  Dyer Pub. Co.), 1908.
 Ohio Roster Commission. Official Roster of the Soldiers of the State of Ohio in the War on the Rebellion, 1861–1865, Compiled Under the Direction of the Roster Commission (Akron, OH: Werner Co.), 1886–1895.
 Reid, Whitelaw. Ohio in the War: Her Statesmen, Her Generals, and Soldiers (Cincinnati, OH: Moore, Wilstach, & Baldwin), 1868. 
Attribution

External links
 Ohio in the Civil War: 20th Ohio Battery by Larry Stevens

Military units and formations established in 1862
Military units and formations disestablished in 1865
Units and formations of the Union Army from Ohio
O
1862 establishments in Ohio